The Law Building (formerly known as the Second National Bank Building and the Key Building) is a high-rise office building located at 159 South Main Street in the city of Akron, Ohio. Construction of the building began in 1910 and was completed in 1911. The building stands at a height of 150 feet, making it one of the tallest buildings in the city. The elaborate brickwork and delicate ornamentation of its facade and rigid-frame structural system are prime examples of characteristics that define neoclassical architecture.

History 
KeyBank moved out of the building in 2011 and opened a new branch and regional headquarters a block away. White Hat Management, one of the state's largest for-profit managers of charter schools, also vacated the building in 2011. After that, 40% of the building was left unoccupied.

See also 
 List of tallest buildings in Akron, Ohio

References 

Bank buildings in Ohio
Office buildings in Akron, Ohio
Neoclassical architecture in Ohio
Office buildings completed in 1910
Skyscrapers in Akron, Ohio
Skyscraper office buildings in Ohio
1910 establishments in Ohio